Kadanwari Gas Field, located in the Middle Indus Basin of Pakistan, was discovered in 1989 and is currently operated by OMV Pakistan.

OMV Pakistan took over the operator-ship of the Kadanwari Gas Processing Plant on 1 January 2003 from Lasmo, currently ENI.

It has an air link to Karachi via Kadanwari Airport.

See also 
 Sawan Gas Field

Populated places in Sindh
Natural gas fields in Pakistan